The Steel Bayonet is a 1957 British war film directed by Michael Carreras and starring Leo Genn, Kieron Moore and Michael Medwin. Michael Caine also had a small role in the film, early in his career. It is set during the Second World War, in the Tunisian desert when a small British observation force are surrounded in a farm by overwhelming forces of the German Afrika Korps. Filming took place on Salisbury Plain, which doubled for North Africa.

Plot

Tunisia 1943

As the North African Campaign draws to a close, and the German and Italian forces are being pushed back on Tunis, a company of British Infantry are tasked with holding a small Arab farm against an expected last-ditch counter-attack; the farm's water tower will be used as an observation point by a few Royal Artillery spotters. To defend the farm British Lt. Colonel Derry picks a company led by Major Alan Gerrard; these men have been in the thick of the fighting around Tunis and are greatly reduced in number (described by the narrator as down to barely two platoons). So Gerrard's company set out on foot for the farm; on the way they are joined by Royal Artillery Captain Dickie Mead and his signaller, Ames. Arriving at the farm, Gerrard's men expel the occupants and dig slit trenches in front of the farm. With the water tower and its ladder in clear view, Mead decides to wait until just before dawn to climb it. The following day Mead uses his position to target artillery fired on to the German forces. All goes well until the Germans send out a reconnaissance patrol to pinpoint the observation post, but Gerrard's men successfully repulse the attack.

With the Germans now sure of the British troops’ position, it becomes a test of nerve for seasoned troops and new boys alike. All of them stick it out until they are finally ordered to retreat with their mission deemed successful. Mead decides to stay behind and cover their escape with artillery fire, leading to the death of Sergeant-Major Gill and Private Middleditch. When Mead finally succumbs to German fire, only the injured Gerrard is left. With the Germans in the farm and his surviving men well on their way to safety, the  now mortally wounded Major radios for the artillery to totally destroy the farm, killing both Gerrard and the Germans' last chance of advancing further on this front.

Cast

 Leo Genn as Major Alan Gerrard
 Kieron Moore as Captain Dickie Mead, Royal Artillery
 Michael Medwin as Lieutenant Vernon
 Robert Brown as Company Sergeant Major Gill
 Michael Ripper as Private Middleditch
 John Paul as Lieutenant Colonel Derry
 Shay Gorman as Sergeant Gates
 Tom Bowman as Sergeant Nicholls
 Jack Stewart as Private Wentworth
 Ian Whittaker as Private Wilson
 Bernard Horsfall as Private Livingstone
 John Watson as Corporal Bean
 Arthur Lovegrove as Private Jarvis
 Percy Herbert as Private Clark
 Paddy Joyce as Corporal Ames, Capt. Meads signaller
 Michael Balfour as Private Thomas
 Raymond Francis as General
 Garard Green as German Company Commander

References

External links 
 

1957 films
1957 war films
British war films
Films directed by Michael Carreras
North African campaign films
Films set in 1943
Hammer Film Productions films
1950s English-language films
1950s British films